Seemi Ezdi is a member of Senate of Pakistan. Her tenure is from March 2018 to 2024.

References 

Members of the Senate of Pakistan
Year of birth missing (living people)
Living people